HMA Gaffar was a Jatiya Party (Ershad) politician and the member of parliament for Khulna-5.

Career
Gaffar was elected to parliament from Khulna-5 as a Jatiya Party candidate in 1986 and 1988.

Gaffar was a veteran of Bangladesh Liberation war. He retired as a lieutenant colonel from Bangladesh Army. He was member of the Central University of Science and Technology trustee board. He was awarded Bir Uttom for gallantry.

Death 
Gaffar died on 12 April 2020 in Combined Military Hospital.

References

Jatiya Party politicians
2020 deaths
3rd Jatiya Sangsad members
4th Jatiya Sangsad members
Recipients of the Bir Uttom
Mukti Bahini personnel
Bangladesh Army officers
Year of birth missing